Duane Eubanks (born January 24, 1969 in Philadelphia) is an American jazz trumpeter and flugelhornist,  known for his participation in Dave Holland's big band. He is the younger brother of Kevin Eubanks and Robin Eubanks.

History

Eubanks was raised in a musical family, but stopped playing in his teens and instead pursued a degree in accounting; six years later, he conceded that this had been an error, and returned to music. He subsequently studied jazz at Temple University,  where he played with Wynton Marsalis and Billy Taylor, and also spent two years training with Johnny Coles.

Eubanks released his first album, My Shining Hour, in 1999, having been approached by a producer who had heard him performing on his brother Robin's album 4: JJ / Slide / Curtis and Al.

Collaborations
Eubanks has also performed with many other musicians and musical groups, including Defunkt, Rhonda Ross, Oliver Lake, Mulgrew Miller, and the Wu-Tang Clan.

Since 1998, he has been on the faculty of the Brooklyn Conservatory of Music.

Awards and honors
In 2002 and 2005, Eubanks shared in the Grammy Awards received by Dave Holland's big band for the albums What Goes Around and Overtime.

In 2013, Eubanks received an Eddy Award from the Philadelphia Education Fund for his services to music education.

Discography
As Leader
My Shining Hour (1999)
Second Take (2001)
Things of That Particular Nature (2015)

As Co-Leader
"DE3:  Live at Maxwell's (2016)

References

External links
Official site

Living people
1969 births
American jazz trumpeters
American male trumpeters
American jazz educators
Musicians from Philadelphia
21st-century trumpeters
Jazz musicians from Pennsylvania
Educators from Pennsylvania
21st-century American male musicians
American male jazz musicians
Central High School (Philadelphia) alumni